The New Zealand Arthropod Collection is a collection of terrestrial invertebrates held by Maanaki Whenua – Landcare Research in Auckland, New Zealand. It specialises in the taxonomy and identification of indigenous and exotic invertebrate species in New Zealand, and is one of New Zealand's Nationally Significant Collections and Databases.

The NZAC provides identification guides to the public in the form of insect factsheets, the "What is this bug" website, and illustrations by Des Helmore.

References

External links
 

Museums in Auckland
 
Biorepositories